Stara Ćuprija Glavatičevo is an old  Ottoman bridge in the center of Glavatičevo village, Bosnia and Herzegovina, spanning Neretva river.

References

See also 
List of bridges in Bosnia and Herzegovina
List of National Monuments of Bosnia and Herzegovina

Ottoman bridges in Bosnia and Herzegovina
National Monuments of Bosnia and Herzegovina
Stone arch bridges in Bosnia and Herzegovina
Demolished bridges
Rebuilt buildings and structures in Bosnia and Herzegovina
Glavatičevo
Upper Neretva